This is a list of the first women lawyer(s) and judge(s) in South Dakota. It includes the year in which the women were admitted to practice law (in parentheses). Also included are women who achieved other distinctions such becoming the first in their state to graduate from law school or become a political figure.

Firsts in South Dakota's history

Lawyers 

First female (bar in the Dakota Territory): Cynthia Eloise Cleveland (1883)   
First female to take exam before the South Dakota Supreme Court: Katie Rockford (1897) 
First female to practice before South Dakota's federal courts: Dorothy Rehfeld

State judges 

 First female: Mildred Ramynke (1939) in 1958
 First female (Fifth Judicial District): Mildred Ramynke (1939) in 1975
 First female (Supreme Court of South Dakota): Judith Meierhenry (1977) in 2002

Federal judges 
 First female (U.S. District Judge for the District of South Dakota): Karen Schreier in 1999

United States Attorney 

 First female: Karen Schreier in 1993

State Bar of South Dakota 

 First female admitted: Blanche Colman (1911) 
 First female presidents: Stephanie Pochop and Pamela Reiter respectively from 2016-2017 and 2017-2018

Firsts in local history 

 Mildred Ramynke (1939): First female appointed as a Judge of the Fifth Judicial District (1975) [Day, Grant, Marshall and Roberts Counties, South Dakota]
 Marjorie Breeden (1907): First female to graduate from the University of South Dakota Law School in Clay County, South Dakota
 Linda Lea M. Viken: First female to serve as a Magistrate Judge for Pennington County, South Dakota
 Shawn Pahlke: First female to serve as the Director of the Pennington County Public Defender’s Office, South Dakota

See also 

 List of first women lawyers and judges in the United States
 Timeline of women lawyers in the United States
 Women in law

Other topics of interest 

 List of first minority male lawyers and judges in the United States
 List of first minority male lawyers and judges in South Dakota

References 

Lawyers, South Dakota, first
South Dakota, first
Women, South Dakota, first
Women, South Dakota, first
Women in South Dakota
South Dakota lawyers
Lists of people from South Dakota